Jasper Humphrey was a member of the Wisconsin State Assembly.

Biography
Humphrey was born on March 15, 1812, in Steuben County, New York. On February 13, 1835, he married Sarah Bull. By trade, he was a sailor and a sea captain.

On February 2, 1892, Humphrey died in Milwaukee, Wisconsin. He was buried in Richmond, Walworth County, Wisconsin. His former home is located in what is now the Walker's Point Historic District.

Public career
Humphrey was an alderman of Milwaukee in 1854 and 1855. Later, he was a member of the Assembly during the 1857 session. In 1877, he was Harbor Master of the Port of Milwaukee. Humphrey was a Democrat.

References

External links

People from Steuben County, New York
Democratic Party members of the Wisconsin State Assembly
Milwaukee Common Council members
American sailors
19th-century sailors
1812 births
1892 deaths
Burials in Wisconsin
19th-century American politicians